Bourne End Academy, is a co-educational secondary school in Bourne End, Buckinghamshire, England. It is a secondary school, which takes pupils from the age of 11 to 18. The school is a smaller than an average secondary school, with just around 800 pupils attending every year.

In September 1998 the school was awarded specialist school status as a Sports College and furthermore, in 2012, the school was awarded the status of a specialist Science College, by the Department for Education and Skills (DfES).

Bourne End Academy is also one of only a number of schools in the area to possess a special department for students on the Autistic spectrum, named as the A.R.P. (Additional Resources Provision) Department.

The academy offers a range of different opportunities to all pupils, including extra curricular clubs. In 2012 Wye Valley achieved 47% A*-C grades (including English and Mathematics) at GCSE with the results below national level placing it in the 4th quantile in comparison to other schools. In 2017, Bourne End Academy achieved 65% A*-C grades (including English and Mathematics) at GCSE. In 2018 the school's GCSE results were -0.28, below average. In 2019 the school's GCSE results declined to -0.49 below average.  The latest national performance data from the Department of Education recognises E-ACT Bourne End Academy as the top comprehensive secondary school in Buckinghamshire with 58% of students achieving a Grade 5 or higher in English and Maths.

The school was put into a state of 'Special Measures' after both the school, and its management, were classified as 'Inadequate' by Ofsted in January 2013. After the report, the school's governing body was disbanded, and an Interim Executive Board (IEB) was imposed, which as of March 2014, is still in place. As of 2017, the school judged  by Ofsted to require improvement but still part of an Interim Executive Board.

in September 2018 the school was taken over by E-ACT and has recently received an Ofsted Inspection rated 'Good' and 'Outstanding' in Leadership and Management. In 2014 E-ACT downsized and 10 schools were re-brokered to other multi-academy trusts. It has since started expanding again. Pupils from E-ACT Burnham Park Academy, which has closed due to falling pupil numbers, have been offered the opportunity of transferring to Bourne End Academy.

A-Levels
Bourne End Academy currently has a 6th form for students studying AS Levels and A2 Levels.
Mathematics
English Literature
Biology
Chemistry
History
Geography
Philosophy
Business Studies (A Level)
Business Studies (BTEC)
Health and Social Care (BTEC)

References

External links
Department for Education Performance Tables 2011

Secondary schools in Buckinghamshire
Academies in Buckinghamshire